Gurkeerat Singh Mann (born 29 June 1990) is an Indian professional cricketer who plays for Punjab in domestic cricket. A right-handed batsman and off break bowler, he is a member of the Gujarat Titans in IPL and a regular in India A team. Singh had a maiden call for the official Indian squad for the South Africa series in 2015. He made his One Day International debut for India against Australia on 17 January 2016.

Domestic career
Gurkeerat plays for Punjab in Indian domestic cricket and represents North Zone in Duleep Trophy and Deodhar Trophy.

On 24 December 2014 while playing for Punjab, he made an unbeaten 73 runs to see his team to victory while chasing 205 for victory on the 4th day. He made his second hundred in first-class cricket against Karnataka. His 201 is also his highest score in first-class cricket.

On 14 August 2015, he made an unbeaten 87 runs off 81 balls in the Triangular Series Final against Australia A to help his team to the title. He walked into bat with India A struggling at 82/5 and needing 145 more runs to win the match. He hit nine fours and two sixes in his knock.

He continued his good form against Bangladesh A team. In the first match of the three-match series, he made 65 runs off 59 balls to help India A go past 300. He followed his fifty with a five-for in the same match to bowl out Bangladesh A for 226. His 5/29 were his best figure in List A cricket.

In July 2018, he was named in the squad for India Green for the 2018–19 Duleep Trophy. He was the leading run-scorer for Punjab in the 2018–19 Vijay Hazare Trophy, with 295 runs in six matches.

International career
After his impressive all-round performance against Bangladesh A Team, Mann was selected in India's 15 man Squad for the 5 match ODI series against South Africa. He was selected in the team for the one day series against Australia in January 2016.

Gurkeerat Singh Mann made his ODI debut against Australian Cricket Team in the third ODI of the 2016 series played in Melbourne.

Indian Premier League
Mann played for Kings XI Punjab in the Indian Premier League from 2012 to 2017. He signed with the franchise in the 2012 IPL auction. He plays as a lower-order batsman as a finisher and has played many notable cameos for his team. His catch to dismiss Ross Taylor of Pune Warriors India in a league game was voted the catch of the tournament for IPL 2013.

In January 2018, he was bought by the Delhi Daredevils in the 2018 IPL auction. In December 2018, he was bought by the Royal Challengers Bangalore in the player auction for the 2019 Indian Premier League.

In April 2021, he was bought by the Kolkata Knight Riders as replacement for Rinku Singh, who is out of the entire 2021 Indian Premier League due to knee injury. In February 2022, he was bought by the Gujarat Titans in the auction for the 2022 Indian Premier League tournament.

References

External links
 

1990 births
Living people
Indian cricketers
India One Day International cricketers
People from Faridkot, Punjab
Punjab, India cricketers
India Green cricketers
India Red cricketers
Punjab Kings cricketers
North Zone cricketers
Punjabi people
People from Sri Muktsar Sahib
Gazi Group cricketers
Kolkata Knight Riders cricketers
Wicket-keepers